Kalanidhi Indira Sangeet Mahavidyalaya (Nepali: कलानिधि इन्दिरा संगीत महाविद्यालय) is an institution that teaches classical music in Nepal. It was established in 1963. This College is acknowledged and accredited by Bhat Khande Sangeet M.V. in Lucknow, India and by Prayag Sangeet Samiti in Allahabad India. Pandit Ranga Rao Kabambari was the first principal. Subsequent principals were Pt. Ganesh B. Bhandadri, Sangeet Pravin Nar Raj Dhakal, and Mohan Prasad Joshi.

It offers music courses including:
 Vocal
 Keyboard
 Guitar
 Israj
 Sarod
 Kathak Dance
 Sitar
 Charya Dance
 Violin
 Traditional Dance
 Tabala
 Folk Dance

References 

Music schools in Nepal
1963 establishments in Nepal